Seth Sikes (born January 30, 1984) is an American singer known primarily as a cabaret performer in New York City.

Early life 

Born in Paris, Texas, the son of educators Bill and Candi Sikes, much of his youth was occupied with acting, playing trumpet and dreaming of Broadway.

New York and 54 Below 

After graduating from North Laramore Highschool, Sikes moved to New York City where he attended Circle in the Square Theater School and subsequently was employed on Broadway as Assistant Director for The Nance, by Douglas Carter Beane, starring Nathan Lane, at the Lyceum Theatre (Broadway), and Associate Director for The Band's Visit (musical), by David Yazbek and Itamar Moses, at the Ethel Barrymore Theatre. 

At his 54 Below debut, Sikes performed before “a sold-out house screaming for more,” according to American film critic, journalist, and media personality Rex Reed. Many return engagements were to follow, as well as appearances in cabarets, nightclubs and cafes across the United States, Puerto Vallarta, Mexico, London and Sitges. Specializing in show tunes, Sikes interprets the songs sung by Judy Garland, Liza Minnelli, Bernadette Peters and Barbra Streisand, among others.

References 

1984 births
Living people
Cabaret singers
American singers